The Juruna language, also known as Yudjá, is spoken in Brazil. It is spoken in the Xingu Indigenous Park of Mato Grosso state. In 2001 there were 278 native speakers. It is the last survivor of the Yuruna languages.

Phonology

Vowels

Consonants

References

Further reading
WALS Online Resources for Juruna. Haspelmath, Martin (editor); Dryer, Matthew S. (editor); Gil, David (editor); Comrie, Bernard (editor). 2008-05-01. Max Planck Digital Library (http://mpdl.mpg.de/). oai:wals.info:languoid/jrn
 

Endangered Tupian languages
Languages of Xingu Indigenous Park